Maitland is a suburb of Cape Town, South Africa.

Maitland is situated along a number of important transport networks connecting the Cape Town city bowl to the rest of the city.  The most important being the railway line that runs through the middle of the suburb and the N1 that is situated on its northern boundary.  The area has always been an important transport hub for the city. 
In 1845 one of the first roads from Stellenbosch through the Maitland area was completed. This effectively connected Cape Town to the rest of Africa as at the time the dunes of the Cape Flats prevented much traffic between the two locations. The suburb is named after Sir Peregrine Maitland who was governor of the Cape in the mid 1840s.

Geography
Maitland lies to the north of Pinelands, south of Brooklyn, east of Salt River

History
During the Second Anglo-Boer War Maitland was the site of a major British cavalry camp, where troops and horses recovered from the voyage from Britain.

Demography
The 2011 census recorded the population of Maitland as consisting of 9,782 people. 49.9% described themselves as "Coloured", 1.9% as "Indian or Asian", 41.1% as "Black African", 2.6% as "White" and 4.0% as "Other". 58.0% spoke English as their first language, 16.5% spoke Afrikaans, 3.8% spoke Xhosa, 1.0% spoke Zulu and 20.7% .

Local schools 
 Maitland High School
 Holy Cross High School
 Koeberg Primary school

In popular culture
The Standard Hotel located in Maitland was featured in the 2012 film Safe House.  It features as one of the "seedy hotels" that the main protagonists seek refuge in.

The shrine of a well known Muslim Sufi saint i.e. Hazarat Khawaja Sayed Mehboob Ali Sha (R.A) is situated at the maitland Cemetery gate 4A is also a source of blessings and unity of many communities. The shrine that still attracts thousands of devotees from all around the world.

References

Suburbs of Cape Town